The Murgul Mare is a volcanic mountain near the village Malnaș in Covasna County, Romania. It lies at the northeastern end of the Baraolt Mountains.

References

Mountains of Romania
Geography of Covasna County